Maurice Gravelines (17 July 1891 – 31 January 1973) was a French footballer. He played in two matches for the France national football team in 1920 and 1922.

References

External links
 

1891 births
1973 deaths
French footballers
France international footballers
Footballers from Lille
Association football midfielders
Footballers at the 1920 Summer Olympics
Olympic footballers of France